Czechoslovakia–Yugoslavia relations were historical foreign relations between Czechoslovakia and Yugoslavia both of which are now-defunct states. Czechoslovakia and the Kingdom of Serbs, Croats and Slovenes were both created as union states of smaller Slavic ethnic groups. Both were created after the dissolution of the Austro-Hungary, itself a multinational empire unable to implement a trialist reform in its final years.

History
During the Austro-Hungarian time the Charles University in Prague and other Czechoslovak institutions of higher education became important center of higher education for South Slavic students with students and graduates including Veljko Vlahović, Ratko Vujović, Aleksandar Deroko, Nikola Dobrović, Petar Drapšin, Zoran Đorđević, Lordan Zafranović, Momir Korunović, Branko Krsmanović, Emir Kusturica, Ljubica Marić, Goran Marković, Predrag Nikolić, Stjepan Radić, Nikola Tesla and other.

Interwar period

In 1921, together with the Kingdom of Romania, Czechoslovakia and Yugoslavia established the Little Entente with the purpose of common defense against Hungarian revanchism and the prospect of a Habsburg restoration. Czechoslovakia and Yugoslavia signed their agreement on 4 June 1920 In 1923 Czechoslovak Republic bought attractive plot in the Bulevar kralja Aleksandra for its new representative diplomatic mission, and the plot was subsequently enlarged in 1931. The laying of the cornerstone was organized on the day of St. Václav the Good day in 1925 with Deputy Minister of Foreign Affairs J. Marković, representatives of the Association of National Minorities in the Kingdom of Serbs, Croats and Slovenes, Mayor of Belgrade Bobić and Head of Department in the Czechoslovak Ministry of Foreign Affairs Dr. Ribarž in attendance.

Cold War period
Both Czechoslovakia and Democratic Federal Yugoslavia were among 51 original member states of the United Nations. Close relations between the two states were canceled after the Tito–Stalin split of 1948. Yugoslavia supported reformist Alexander Dubček and political liberalization in Czechoslovakia which took place in the period of Prague Spring. Contrary to its verbal support to Soviet intervention in Hungary in 1956, Yugoslavia strongly condemned the Warsaw Pact invasion of Czechoslovakia in 1968. On 12 July 1968 President of Yugoslavia Josip Broz Tito gave an interview to Egyptian daily Al-Ahram where he stated that he believes that Soviet leaders are not "such short-sighted people [...] who would pursue a policy of force to resolve the internal affairs of Czechoslovakia". President Tito visited Prague on 9 and 10 August 1968, just days before the intervention while large group of 250,000 demonstrators gathered in Belgrade once the intervention started. Yugoslavia provided refuge for numerous Czechoslovak citizens (many on holidays) and politicians including Ota Šik, Jiří Hájek, František Vlasak and Štefan Gašparik. 1969 Non-Aligned Consultative Meeting was held in Belgrade following the events in Czechoslovakia.

Post 1989 relations
Both federal states faced rising economic and nationalist challenges in late 1980's, issues that culminated in the violent breakup of Yugoslavia in what is known as the Yugoslav Wars-a situation that contrasted sharply with the peaceful dissolution of Czechoslovakia. Contrary to what was seen following the dissolution of the Soviet Union, wherein the Russian Federation was internationally recognized as the sole successor state of the USSR, none of the former Czechoslovak or Yugoslav constituent republics achieved such status. The Czech Republic and Slovakia reached an agreement on shared succession based on which both had to reapply and rejoin all international organizations and agreements. Nevertheless the Czech Republic unilaterally decided to keep the old flag of Czechoslovakia as its own flag (despite being contrary to the agreement), but avoided any claim on sole succession. In the Yugoslav case, the Federal Republic of Yugoslavia (Serbia and Montenegro) initially asserted that it was the sole legal successor state to the Socialist Federal Republic of Yugoslavia but their claim which was rejected by U.N. Security Council Resolution 777. The Arbitration Commission of the Peace Conference on Yugoslavia asserted in its Opinion No. 1, that the Socialist Federative Republic of Yugoslavia is in the process of dissolution while Opinion No. 10 stated that the FRY (Serbia and Montenegro) could not legally be considered a continuation of the former SFRY, but it was a new state. After initial resistance to this legal opinion (partially supported by certain Non-Aligned countries), The so-called Federal Republic of Yugoslavia accepted shared succession after the overthrow of Slobodan Milošević. In the process of peaceful dissolution of state union between Serbia and Montenegro in 2006 Montenegro accepted that Serbia remain the sole successor of their union, inheriting international rights and obligations, notably the guaranty of territorial integrity from the United Nations Security Council Resolution 1244.

As Czechoslovak Federation continued to exist until 1993, the country established bilateral relations with some newly independent and recognized post-Yugoslav states over the course of 1992.

See also
Austro-Slavism
Bled agreement (1938)
Czechs of Croatia
Czechs in Serbia
Croats in Slovakia
Slovaks of Croatia
Czech Corridor
History of Orthodox Church of the Czech Lands and Slovakia
Macedonians in the Czech Republic
Mausoleum of Yugoslav Soldiers in Olomouc
Nova borba
Prague Slavic Congress, 1848
Serbs of Slovakia
Slovaks in Serbia
Slánský trial
Dissolution of Austria-Hungary
Death and state funeral of Josip Broz Tito
Czech Republic – Serbia relations
Serbia–Slovakia relations
Czechoslovakia at the 1984 Winter Olympics

References

Further reading

Books
 Vojtechovsky, Ondrej (2016). Iz Praga protiv Tita : Jugoslavenska informbiroovska emigracija u Čehoslovačkoj. (in Serbo-Croatian) [English: From Prague v. Tito: Yugoslav Informbureau Emigration in Czechoslovakia]. Zagreb: Moderna vremena.

Articles
Czechoslovakia and Yugoslavia: Division and disintegration. Deutsche Welle.
Valerie J. Bunce. 141. The Violent Dissolution of Yugoslavia: A Comparative Perspective. Wilson Center.

 
Yugoslavia
Bilateral relations of Yugoslavia
Czech Republic–Serbia relations
Bosnia and Herzegovina–Czech Republic relations
Croatia–Czech Republic relations
Czech Republic–Kosovo relations
Czech Republic–Montenegro relations
Czech Republic–North Macedonia relations
Czech Republic–Serbia and Montenegro relations
Czech Republic–Slovenia relations
Serbia–Slovakia relations
Bosnia and Herzegovina–Slovakia relations
Croatia–Slovakia relations
Montenegro–Slovakia relations
North Macedonia–Slovakia relations
Serbia and Montenegro–Slovakia relations
Slovakia–Slovenia relations